Deffest! and Baddest! is the third solo studio album released by Wendy O. Williams and the last album she recorded. The album was credited to "Wendy O. Williams' Ultrafly and the Hometown Girls".

Track listing
"Rulers of Rock"		
"$10,000,000 Winner" 		
"Super Jock Guy" 		
"Early Days" 		
"The Humpty Song" 		
"Know Wa'am Say'n?" 		
"On the IRT" 		
"Lies" 		
"La La Land" 		
"Laffing 'n' Scratching"

External links

Wendy O. Williams albums
1988 albums
Profile Records albums